The 2011 UK Open Qualifier 7 was the seventh of eight 2011 UK Open Darts Qualifiers which was held at the Robin Park Tennis Centre in Wigan on Saturday 30 April.

Prize money

Draw

References

7